The 1994 Arkansas Razorbacks football team represented the University of Arkansas during the 1994 NCAA Division I-A football season.

Schedule

Roster

References

Arkansas
Arkansas Razorbacks football seasons
Arkansas Razorbacks football